Dale Cairns Thomson  (17 June 1923 – 27 April 1999) was a professor and departmental director at the Université de Montréal, professor and Vice-Principal of McGill University and a professor of international relations and Director of the Center of Canadian Studies at Johns Hopkins University's School of Advanced International Studies in Washington, D.C. and the author of several important historical works.

Born on a Westlock, Alberta farm, Dale Thomson served in the Royal Canadian Air Force during World War II and was awarded the Distinguished Flying Cross. At the end of the war, he attended the University of Alberta, graduating with a B.A. degree in 1948. Fluent in the French language, he then obtained a diploma in international relations from the University of Paris in 1950 and his doctorate from the university's Faculty of Letters in 1951. To do his thesis entitled "General Haushofer and his Ideas on Geopolitics," Thomson spent time in Germany, becoming fluent in the German language.

Returning to Canada, Thomson worked for a short time at the National Film Board of Canada before being invited to serve as Associate Private Secretary to Canadian Prime Minister, Louis St. Laurent where he remained until 1958. Involved with both the Liberal Party of Quebec and the Liberal Party of Canada, in the 1958 Canadian federal election Thomson was the unsuccessful Liberal candidate in the Jasper—Edson riding.

Following his brief foray into politics, Thomson returned to academia where he forged an outstanding career that included authoring a number of important books. In addition, he wrote articles in the Canadian press and was a frequent television and radio guest commentator concerning Canadian politics.

Dale Thomson died in 1999 after a lengthy illness. His archive is held at the McGill University Archives.

Academic positions
 Université de Montréal - professor (1960–1969), departmental director (1963–1967)
 Johns Hopkins University's School of Advanced International Studies - professor of international relations and founding director of the Director of the Center of Canadian Studies (1969–1973)
 McGill University - Vice-Principal (1973–1976) and Professor of Political Science (1973–1994)

Affiliations 
 Association for Canadian Studies in the United States
 Canadian Political Science Association/Société Canadienne de Science Politique
 International Society for Political Psychology
 International Association for Mass Communication Research
 Member of the Board of Directors of the International Centre for Ethnic Studies, Sri Lanka

Books
Alexander Mackenzie : Clear Grit (1960)
Louis St. Laurent, Canadian (1967)
Canadian Foreign Policy : Options And Perspectives  (with Roger F. Swanson, 1971)
Quebec Society And Politics: Views From The Inside (1973)
Mémoire à la Commission parlementaire de l'Assemblée nationale du Québec à propos du projet de loi no 1, Charte de la langue française au Québec (1977)
Jean Lesage & The Quiet Revolution (1984)
Vive le Québec Libre (1988)

External links
 Dale Cairns Thomson Fonds. McGill University Library & Archives
Empire Club Addresses, Dale C. Thomson, March 12, 1970

References

Canadian military personnel of World War II
Recipients of the Distinguished Flying Cross (United Kingdom)
University of Alberta alumni
University of Paris alumni
Canadian political scientists
Academic staff of McGill University
Members of the United Church of Canada
Academic staff of the Université de Montréal
Johns Hopkins University faculty
Canadian non-fiction writers
People from Westlock County
1923 births
1999 deaths
Candidates in the 1958 Canadian federal election
Liberal Party of Canada candidates for the Canadian House of Commons
20th-century non-fiction writers
Canadian expatriates in the United States
Canadian expatriates in France
Canadian expatriates in Germany
20th-century political scientists